Kaniyan Poongunranar, also Poongundranar or Pungundranar, was an influential Tamil philosopher from the Sangam age from around 6th century BCE. His name Kaniyan implies that he was an Kaala Kanithar (astronomer) (kaala kanitham in Tamil literally means mathematics of date, time and place). Kaniyan was born and brought up in Mahibalanpatti, a village panchayat in Tamil Nadu's Sivaganga district. He composed two poems in Puṟanāṉūṟu and Natrinai.

Purananuru (Verse 192)

Themes

Cosmopolitanism 
Poongundranar rejected division of mankind into various categories and emphasised the universality of all humans. The Tamil bards and intellectuals of the time of Poongundranar and those preceding his age considered that all humans, whatever their rank or station in life, were alike.

Natural law 
Poongundranar states that the wooden log is carried by the water in its direction and similarly postulates that everything in life will also follow karma. This he calls 'Way of Order'().

Principles of the Way of Order 
Throughout his poem, Poongundranar lays down the principles of his version of natural law. The first part of the poem deals with the basic principles of the 'Way of Order'() which is his term for natural law.

Every human of every town is of the same value because they are கேளிர் (related). Hence, all people should be bound by one, same moral and legal code.
நன்று (good) and தீது (evil) do not come from others. Hence, humans are liable for both the pleasure and suffering they feel.
Death is a natural part of the cycle of life, it is not new. Hence, this life must be made use of to its full potential.

Allegory of the raft 
Poongundranar further goes onto explain these principles with an example of a raft.

He compares birth to lightning, suggesting it can happen spontaneously anywhere.
He gives an example of a raft which is allegorical to human life going downstream a steep hill, having a perilous journey through boulders and faces its climax just as in திறவோர் காட்சியில் (lit. Wisemen's vision means fate) which is death.
He concludes that since everyone's life is like the raft's journey, it is irrational to magnify the பெரியோ[ர்] (accomplished people) and even worse to diminish சிறியோ[ர்](less accomplished people), because everyone goes through similar tribulations whatever their social estate might be.

Influence 
Poongundranar was extremely influential in the revivalist Self-respect movement. The sentence "Yaadhum Oore Yaavarum Kelir" has been adopted as the motto of the World Thamizh Confederation to represent Tamil people.

The quote "Yaadhum Oore Yaavarum Kelir" is at present depicted in the United Nations Organisation. G. G. Ponnambalam concluded his 1966 address to the 21st session of the United Nations General Assembly by invoking this quote. A. P. J Abdul Kalam  was the first one to quote this famous quote in European Union Historical Speech by Abdul Kalam in European Union and the another one is Narendra Modi who quoted it in 74th Session of the UN General Assembly.

Kaniyan Poongundranar's Yathum oore poem has been declared as the theme song of the 10th World Tamil Conference scheduled in Chicago. American composer Rajan Somasundaram has given the first music form for the 2000-year-old poetry. It has been sung by Academy nominated singer Bombay Jayashri and Karthik (singer) among other international artists.
 
The first musical form of Yaadhum Oore poem by composer Rajan Somasundaram was chosen as the theme song of 10th World Tamil Conference from the album Sandham: Symphony Meets Classical Tamil and was featured in Amazon's Top#10 International Music albums.

Natrinai (Verse 226)

See also

 Sangam literature
 List of Sangam poets

References

Tamil philosophy
Ancient Indian philosophers
Tamil poets
People from Sivaganga district
Scholars from Tamil Nadu
Sangam poets